U-434 may refer to:

 , Type VII submarine launched in 1941; sunk in 1941 on her first patrol
 , (now known as U-434), a  built in 1976; currently a museum ship in Hamburg

Ship names